Aki and Pawpaw is a 2021 Nigerian comedy film co-produced by Play Network Studios and Film One Entertainment. The comedy film directed by Biodun Stephen, written by Steph Boyo and Ozioma Ogbaji was a remake of the Aki na Ukwa 2002 comedic movie produced by Chinedu Ikedieze and Osita Iheme. It was released on 15 December 2021, showing in cinemas nationwide on 17 December 2021. The comedy stars Amechi Muonagor, Real Warri Pikin, Blessing Jessica Obasi, Charles Inojie, Chioma Okafor, Uti Nwachukwu, Toyin Abraham, Stan Nze, Juliet Ibrahim, and Francis Sule.

Synopsis 
Aki and Pawpaw accidentally fall into fame and wealth they craved for through the help of social media with one of their tricks and now must deal with the problems that come from wealth and fame.

Cast 
 Chinedu Ikedieze
 Osita Iheme
 Toyin Abraham
 Amaechi Muonagor
 Real Warri Pikin
 Uti Nwachukwu
 Stan Nze
 MC Lively
 Beverly Osu
 Juliet Ibrahim
 Hanks Anuku
 Chioma Okafor

References 

2021 films
Nigerian comedy films
2021 comedy films
English-language Nigerian films
2020s English-language films